Eurycratides ("wide ruler") was the thirteenth king of Sparta from the Agiad dynasty. He succeeded his father Anaxander around 615 BC and reigned during a devastating period of war with Tegea.

In 590 BC, Eurycratides was succeeded by his son Leon ("lion"). His grandson was King Anaxandridas II.

References

External links 

7th-century BC rulers
6th-century BC rulers
7th-century BC Spartans
6th-century BC Spartans
Agiad kings of Sparta
590 BC deaths
Year of birth unknown